Oplurus cyclurus, also known commonly as the Madagascar swift and Merrem's Madagascar swift, is a species of lizard in the family Opluridae. The species is endemic to Madagascar. It is arboreal and has a mostly insectivorous diet. Its breeding is timed with the rainy season.

Description
Oplurus cyclurus is similar in appearance to Oplurus cuvieri; so the two species may be easily confused.

Oplurus cyclurus is slightly smaller than Oplurus cuvieri, both of which have a distinctive large spiny tail. Neither species has a dorsal crest.  Oplurus cyclurus has a dark brown or black band around the neck and similar paler markings on its back.

Behavior, habitat, and geographic range
O. cyclurus is mostly arboreal, living in the spiny forests of southern and southwestern Madagascar.

Reproduction
O. cyclurus is oviparous.

References

Further reading
Merrem B (1820). Versuch eines Systems der Amphibien: Tentamen Systematis Amphibiorum. Marburg: J.C. Krieger. xv + 191 pp. + one plate. (Uromastyx cyclurus, new species, p. 56). (in German and Latin).
Savage JM (1952). "The Correct Generic Names for the Iguanid Lizards of Madagascar and the Fiji Islands". Copeia 1952 (3): 182. (Oplurus cyclurus, new combination).
Schlüter, Uwe (2013). Madagaskarleguane: Lebensweise, Pflege und Fortpflanzung [= Madagascar Iguanas: Habits, Care and Reproduction]. Rheinstetten: Kirschner & Seufer Verlag. 88 pp. . (in German).

Oplurus
Reptiles of Madagascar
Endemic fauna of Madagascar
Reptiles described in 1820